Kundur Island is an island within the Riau Archipelago, part of the Riau Islands Province of Indonesia. According to the 2010 Census population, the population of Kundur Island was 67,090. As Kundur does not have an airport, all visitors arrive by ferry.

Most connections are with neighbouring islands, e.g. Tanjung Balai on Great Karimun Island, and mainland Sumatra. Direct ferry services to Singapore have been terminated because of decreasing profits, so travellers need to detour via Batam or Bintan.

Different areas

Main areas

Tanjung Batu

The biggest town on Kundur Island, Tanjung Batu is marked as the district city (kota kecematan) of the island. It is located at the southern tip of the island, and is the hub for most ferry businesses.

It is the town with most number of businesses and trading companies. It is also a popular starting/finishing point for cycling trips as well.

Its commercial street is Jalan Merdeka, just a stone's throw away from the port, but most of the shops are lined on the side of Jalan Kartini and Jalan Jendral Sudirman. Jalan Usman Harun is a temple street where it locates the Vihara Dharma Shanti which is a Buddhist temple. North to the end of Jalan J. Sudirman is a housing area called Batu Dua. Vehicles used in this towns include angkuts and ojeks.

Urung

A town on the sub-district of North Kundur (Kundur Utara). It is just a bit smaller than Tanjung Batu, and also another popular starting/finishing point for cycling trips.

Selat Belia

A town on the northern tip of Kundur Island. It means "straits of youth" in Bahasa Indonesia

Sungai Ungar

A village on the south-east zone of Kundur Island.

Sawang

A town located in the sub-district of West Kundur. It is the town where the biggest hotel in Kundur Island, Hotel Taman Gembira, stands on.

References

External links

Riau Archipelago
Landforms of the Riau Islands
Islands of Sumatra